Vice Squad is a 1953 American film noir crime film directed by Arnold Laven and starring Edward G. Robinson and Paulette Goddard. The film is also known as The Girl in Room 17.

Plot
A married undertaker having an affair, Jack Hartrampf, is a reluctant eyewitness to the shooting of a Los Angeles cop. He does not wish to testify, but captain of detectives "Barney" Barnaby is just as determined. After a bank robbery pulled by Alan Barkis and his gang, another policeman is gunned down and a bank teller is taken hostage. Escort agency madam Mona Ross is willing to help Barnaby with the case for a fee. Barnaby places one of Barkis' partners, Marty Kusalich, under arrest until Marty implicates the real killer. Pete Monte steals a boat in an attempt to get Barkis to freedom, but Barnaby and his lieutenant, Lacey, arrive in the nick of time.

Cast
 Edward G. Robinson as Capt. Barnaby
 Paulette Goddard as Mona Ross
 K.T. Stevens as Ginny
 Porter Hall as Jack Hartrampf
 Adam Williams as Marty Kusalich
 Edward Binns as Al Barkis
 Barry Kelley as Dwight Foreman
 Jay Adler as Frankie Pierce
 Mary Ellen Kay as Carol Lawson
 Joan Vohs as Vicke Webb
 Lee Van Cleef as Pete Monte
 Harlan Warde as Det. Lacey
 Dan Riss as Lt. Bob Inlay
 Lewis Martin as Police Lt. Ed Chisolm
 Byron Kane as Prof. Bruno Varney

References

External links
 
 
 
 
 

1953 crime drama films
1953 films
American black-and-white films
American crime drama films
American detective films
Film noir
Films directed by Arnold Laven
Films produced by Sol Lesser
Films scored by Herschel Burke Gilbert
Films set in Los Angeles
United Artists films
1950s English-language films
1950s American films